The 2008–09 NBA season was the 63rd season of the National Basketball Association (NBA). The Los Angeles Lakers defeated the Orlando Magic in the 2009 NBA Finals, four games to one.

The 2008 NBA draft was held on June 28, 2008, and Derrick Rose was selected first overall by the Chicago Bulls and eventually was awarded the 2009 NBA Rookie of the Year Award. The 2009 NBA All-Star Game was hosted at the US Airways Center in Phoenix. The Western Conference All-Stars defeated the Eastern Conference All-Stars 146–119. The All-Star Game co-MVPs were Shaquille O'Neal and Kobe Bryant.

This was the first NBA season since 1966–67 without a Seattle franchise, as the SuperSonics moved to Oklahoma City, Oklahoma in July 2008 and became the Oklahoma City Thunder.

Transactions

Coaching changes 

On November 21, 2008, the Oklahoma City Thunder fired head coach P. J. Carlesimo and assistant coach Paul Westhead after a 1–12 start. Scott Brooks was named interim head coach for the rest of the season.
On November 24, 2008, the Washington Wizards fired head coach Eddie Jordan after a 1–10 start. Ed Tapscott took over for the remainder of the season.
On December 3, 2008, the Toronto Raptors fired head coach Sam Mitchell, one day after the team lost by 39 points against the Denver Nuggets. Jay Triano was named the team's interim head coach.
On December 8, 2008, the Minnesota Timberwolves fired head coach Randy Wittman after a 4–15 start to the season. Kevin McHale was announced as his replacement.
On December 13, 2008, the Philadelphia 76ers fired head coach Maurice Cheeks after a 9–14 start. Assistant general manager Tony DiLeo was appointed interim head coach for the rest of the season.
On December 15, 2008, the Sacramento Kings fired head coach Reggie Theus after a 6–18 start to the season.  Assistant coach Kenny Natt was appointed interim head coach.
On January 22, 2009, the Memphis Grizzlies fired head coach Marc Iavaroni. Assistant coach Johnny Davis was appointed interim head coach, and three days later, Lionel Hollins took over as head coach.
On February 16, 2009, the Phoenix Suns fired head coach Terry Porter. He was replaced by Alvin Gentry.

Notable occurrences
July
On July 2, 2008, the city of Seattle and the Seattle SuperSonics (owned by the Oklahoma City, Oklahoma-based Professional Basketball Club LLC) reached a settlement where the defendants agreed to pay $45 million to relocate the team to Oklahoma City, retain the SuperSonics' players, coaches, and contracts, and "share" the SuperSonics' franchise history with a hypothetical future Seattle team. However, the SuperSonics name, colors, and logo will remain reserved for a future Seattle club. The team was named the Oklahoma City Thunder on September 3, 2008.
On July 23, 2008, restricted free agent Josh Childress signed with Euroleague club Olympiacos for three years and $20 million net (the biggest signing in Euroleague history), marking the first departure of an American-born player to Europe in the prime of his career.

October
On October 11, 2008, the NBA's first outdoor game in more than three decades was held on the Indian Wells Tennis Garden in Indian Wells, California. The game was played between the Denver Nuggets and Phoenix Suns, who played the last outdoor game against the Milwaukee Bucks in 1972.
On October 23, 2008, the NBA Board of Governors (owners) approved expanded use of instant replays for this season to determine if made baskets would be worth two or three points, and to award either two or three free throws on shooting fouls.

December
On December 10, 2008, Carmelo Anthony scored 33 of his season-high 45 points in the third quarter in a win against the Minnesota Timberwolves, breaking the franchise record and equaling the league record for most points in a quarter.
On December 11, 2008, Cuttino Mobley retired from the NBA because of a severe case of hypertrophic cardiomyopathy, a heart disease.
On December 25, 2008, the Los Angeles Lakers broke the Boston Celtics' 19-game winning streak in a rematch of the previous season's NBA Finals.

January
On January 22, 2009, Alonzo Mourning retired from the NBA after 15 seasons.
February
On February 4, 2009, LeBron James's 52-point triple-double against the New York Knicks on February 4 was negated by subtracting a rebound from his total. The negated rebound was given to Ben Wallace. James would have been the first player since Kareem Abdul-Jabbar in 1975 to have a 50-point triple-double.
On February 5, 2009, the Los Angeles Lakers broke another Celtic winning streak this time at 12-game winning streak, joining a short list of teams to break two 12+ game win streaks in a season.
On February 8, 2009, the Los Angeles Lakers broke the Cleveland Cavaliers' 23-game home-winning streak. In doing so, the Lakers became the first team in NBA history to win back-to-back games on the road (Boston and Cleveland) against teams with .800-plus win percentages at least 40 games into the season.

NBA All-Star Break
The 2009 NBA All-Star Game was played at the US Airways Center, home of the Phoenix Suns, on February 15, 2009, with the West winning 146–119 and the Phoenix Suns' Shaquille O'Neal and Los Angeles Lakers' Kobe Bryant being named the Co-MVPs. During the NBA All-Star Weekend, Nate Robinson of the New York Knicks won the Sprite Slam Dunk competition; Kevin Durant, who won the Rookie Challenge MVP, also won the inaugural H.O.R.S.E Competition and Miami's Daequan Cook beat Rashard Lewis in a tiebreaker to win the Foot Locker Three-Point Shootout.

On February 20, 2009, Utah Jazz owner Larry H. Miller died from complications of diabetes at the age of 64.
On February 20, 2009, the Phoenix Suns became the first team since the 1990 Portland Trail Blazers to have three consecutive games of scoring 140 points or more.
On February 22, 2009, Portland Trail Blazers point guard Steve Blake tied an NBA record by recording 14 assists in the first quarter in a game against the Los Angeles Clippers.
On February 26, 2009, Chicago Bulls legends Norm Van Lier and Johnny "Red" Kerr died at the ages of 61 and 76, respectively.

March
On March 3, 2009, in the NBA's third annual Noche Latina event, a program that recognizes the NBA's fans and players from across Latin America and U.S. Hispanic communities, the Los Angeles Lakers wore celebratory jerseys (with the wording Los Lakers) in their 99–89 win over the Memphis Grizzlies. Noche Latina celebrations took place in eight of the top ten American Hispanic markets in the NBA this season (up from four in 2007–08): Los Angeles, Miami, Phoenix, San Antonio, Dallas, Chicago, Houston and New York.
On March 10, 2009, the Utah Jazz won their 12th game in a row. That was the fourth-longest win streak in franchise history and the longest since 1999. It was later broken by a loss to the Atlanta Hawks.
On March 13, 2009, Detroit Pistons owner William Davidson died at the age of 86.
On March 13, 2009, the Philadelphia 76ers hosted the Chicago Bulls at their former home, the Wachovia Spectrum, instead of their regular home, the Wachovia Center. The Sixers left the Spectrum following the 1995–96 season to move to the former John F. Kennedy Stadium site.
On March 15, 2009, the Phoenix Suns scored the third-highest number of points in a regulation game—without overtime—in a 154–130 win against the Golden State Warriors. They also scored 56 fast-break points, the highest recorded since the league began tracking the stat in 1997. The win also included two 40+ point quarters, 42 in the first and 46 in the third.
On March 21, 2009, Shaquille O'Neal moved from sixth all-time leading scorer to fifth, surpassing Moses Malone.

April
On April 2, 2009, the NBA teamed up with NRDC for the first-ever NBA Green Week 2009 in an effort to generate awareness and funds for protecting the environment. The week featured special on-court apparel, auctions to support environmental protection organizations, hands-on community service projects and the launch of a PSA featuring Hollywood icon and NRDC Trustee Robert Redford. The Denver Nuggets, the Charlotte Bobcats, and the Chicago Bulls wore green-colored uniforms and socks made from 45 percent organic cotton during select home games throughout the week to raise additional environmental awareness. NBA partner adidas outfitted all players with 100 percent organic cotton adidas shooting shirts featuring the NBA Green logo, which were worn during every game that week.
On April 10, 2009, Kobe Bryant moved from the 18th all-time leading scorer to 17th, surpassing Charles Barkley.
On April 15, 2009, the Cleveland Cavaliers finished the season with a home record of 39–2, just one game shy of matching the all-time record.
On April 15, 2009, Shaquille O'Neal led the league in field goal percentage for an NBA-record tenth time.
On April 23, 2009, Dikembe Mutombo retired after 18 seasons in the NBA, at age 42.
On April 27, 2009, the Denver Nuggets matched the largest margin of victory in an NBA playoff game by beating the New Orleans Hornets 121–63, in Game 4 of the 2009 NBA playoffs. The record is shared with the Minneapolis Lakers 133–75 victory over the St. Louis Hawks in 1956.
On April 30, 2009, the Chicago Bulls and the Boston Celtics played in a record fourth overtime game in a single playoff series.

May
On May 9, 2009, Hall of Fame head coach Chuck Daly died of pancreatic cancer at the age of 78. For the entire NBA Playoffs, all NBA coaches and commentators wore pins with the initials "CD" on their suits to honor the Hall of Fame coach.
On May 21, 2009, Sam Cassell retired after 15 seasons in the NBA, at age 39.
On May 22, 2009, World Wrestling Entertainment and the Denver Nuggets were involved in a double-booking controversy, where WWE's WWE Raw was supposed to be held at the Pepsi Center on May 25. But Game 4 of the Western Conference Finals was also booked in the same venue on the same date. As a result, WWE decided to move the show, ironically, to the Staples Center, the home of the Nuggets' conference finals opponents, the Los Angeles Lakers.

June
On June 14, 2009, the Los Angeles Lakers captured their 15th NBA title in franchise history with a 99–86 victory over the Orlando Magic in Game 5 of the 2009 NBA Finals. This also marked the tenth NBA Title for head coach Phil Jackson. In winning his tenth title, he passed Red Auerbach to obtain the crown of most titles for an NBA head coach.

Records broken
On December 17, 2008, Chris Paul of the New Orleans Hornets broke the 22-year-old record for consecutive games with a steal (105), previously held by Alvin Robertson, in a game against Robertson's former team, the San Antonio Spurs. The streak reached 108 games before ending on the December 25 against the Orlando Magic.
On December 23, 2008, the Boston Celtics recorded the best two-loss start in NBA history (27–2), in a 110–91 victory over the Philadelphia 76ers. They also broke a franchise record for the longest winning streak (18) with their 19th consecutive win. Their winning streak came to an end after a loss to the Los Angeles Lakers.
On January 13, 2009, the Orlando Magic made an NBA record 23 three-pointers against the Sacramento Kings. Nine of the twelve Magic players who played in the game made at least one three-pointer.
On February 2, 2009, Kobe Bryant set a record for most points scored in a game at the modern Madison Square Garden (61), besting the 60 points set by Bernard King. That was until Carmelo Anthony broke the record (62) in January 2014 against the Charlotte Bobcats.
On March 15, 2009, the Phoenix Suns scored 56 fast-break points against the Golden State Warriors, the most recorded in a single game since the league began tracking the stat in 1997.
On April 15, 2009, the Raptors' José Calderón topped the 1980–81 Rockets' Calvin Murphy for the NBA record for free-throw percentage. Calderón made 98.1% of his free throws in the season, missing only 3 of the 154 he took, taking the record from Murphy's mark of 95.8%.
On April 15, 2009, Rudy Fernández of the Portland Trail Blazers set the rookie record for three-point field goals made in a season with 159.

2008–09 NBA changes
Charlotte Bobcats – changed their uniforms added pinstripes with side panels to their jerseys and shorts.
Denver Nuggets – slightly changed their primary logo added dark blue to their color scheme.
Indiana Pacers – added new gold road alternate uniforms.
Milwaukee Bucks – added new red road alternate uniforms.
Minnesota Timberwolves – added new logo and new uniforms, remained with dark blue, green, black and grey to their color scheme, added side panels to their jerseys and shorts.
New Orleans Hornets – added new logo and new uniforms, added blue to their color scheme, added pinstripes with side panels to their jerseys and shorts.
Oklahoma City Thunder – relocation from Seattle, Washington to Oklahoma City, Oklahoma, added new logo and new uniforms, added orange sunset, thunder blue, yellow, dark navy blue and black to their color scheme, added side panels to their jerseys and shorts.
Orlando Magic – changed their uniforms and their wordmark to their jerseys, added pinstripes with black side panels to their jerseys and shorts.
Sacramento Kings – changed their uniforms, the purple road jersey changed from "Sacramento" wordmark script to the "Kings" wordmark script with black side panels to their jerseys and shorts, and the white home jersey changed from the "Kings" wordmark script to "Sacramento" wordmark script with changed colors from purple to black side panels to their jerseys and shorts.
Toronto Raptors – slightly changed their primary logo removing the purple area to their color scheme, added new black road alternate uniforms with red and grey side panels to their jerseys and shorts.

Standings

By division

Eastern Conference

Western Conference

By conference

x- clinched playoff berth
y- clinched division title
c- clinched home court advantage for the conference playoffs
z- clinched home court advantage for the entire playoffs

Tiebreakers

Eastern Conference
 Philadelphia finished ahead of Chicago based on conference record (the 76ers' 25–27 to the Bulls' 24–28).

Western Conference
 Denver finished ahead of San Antonio based on head-to-head record (2–1) and Portland based on divisional record (the Nuggets' 12–4 to the Trail Blazers' 11–5), while San Antonio finished ahead of Portland upon winning the Southwest Division.

Playoffs
Teams in bold advanced to the next round. The numbers to the left of each team indicate the team's seeding in its conference, and the numbers to the right indicate the number of games the team won in that round. The division champions are marked by an asterisk. Home court advantage does not necessarily belong to the higher-seeded team, but instead the team with the better regular season record; teams enjoying the home advantage are shown in italics.

Statistics leaders

Awards

Yearly awards
Most Valuable Player: LeBron James, Cleveland Cavaliers
Defensive Player of the Year: Dwight Howard, Orlando Magic
Rookie of the Year: Derrick Rose, Chicago Bulls
Sixth Man of the Year: Jason Terry, Dallas Mavericks
Most Improved Player: Danny Granger, Indiana Pacers
Coach of the Year: Mike Brown, Cleveland Cavaliers
Executive of the Year: Mark Warkentien, Denver Nuggets
Sportsmanship Award: Chauncey Billups, Denver Nuggets
J. Walter Kennedy Citizenship Award: Dikembe Mutombo, Houston Rockets

All-NBA First Team:
 F LeBron James – Cleveland Cavaliers
 F Dirk Nowitzki – Dallas Mavericks
 C Dwight Howard – Orlando Magic
 G Kobe Bryant – Los Angeles Lakers
 G Dwyane Wade – Miami Heat
NBA All-Defensive First Team:
 Dwight Howard – Orlando Magic
 Kobe Bryant – Los Angeles Lakers
 LeBron James – Cleveland Cavaliers
 Chris Paul – New Orleans Hornets
 Kevin Garnett – Boston Celtics
NBA All-Rookie First Team:
 Derrick Rose – Chicago Bulls
 O. J. Mayo – Memphis Grizzlies
 Russell Westbrook – Oklahoma City Thunder
 Brook Lopez – New Jersey Nets
 Michael Beasley – Miami Heat

All-NBA Second Team:
 F Tim Duncan – San Antonio Spurs
 F Paul Pierce – Boston Celtics
 C Yao Ming – Houston Rockets
 G Chris Paul – New Orleans Hornets
 G Brandon Roy – Portland Trail Blazers
NBA All-Defensive Second Team:
 Tim Duncan – San Antonio Spurs
 Dwyane Wade – Miami Heat
 Rajon Rondo – Boston Celtics
 Shane Battier – Houston Rockets
 Ron Artest – Houston Rockets
NBA All-Rookie Second Team:
 Eric Gordon – Los Angeles Clippers
 Kevin Love – Minnesota Timberwolves
 Mario Chalmers – Miami Heat
 Marc Gasol – Memphis Grizzlies
 D. J. Augustin – Charlotte Bobcats (tie)
 Rudy Fernández – Portland Trail Blazers (tie)

All-NBA Third Team:
 F Carmelo Anthony – Denver Nuggets
 F Pau Gasol – Los Angeles Lakers
 C Shaquille O'Neal – Phoenix Suns
 G Tony Parker – San Antonio Spurs
 G Chauncey Billups – Denver Nuggets

Players of the week
The following players were named the Eastern and Western Conference Players of the Week.

Players of the month
The following players were named the Eastern and Western Conference Players of the Month.

Rookies of the month
The following players were named the Eastern and Western Conference Rookies of the Month.

Coaches of the month
The following coaches were named the Eastern and Western Conference Coaches of the Month.

Salary cap
The NBA announced that the salary cap for the season would be $58.680 million, immediately going into effect on July 9 as the league's "moratorium period" had ended and teams could begin signing free agents and making trades.

The tax level for the season was set at $71.150 million, with each team paying a $1 tax for each $1 by which it exceeds $71.150 million. The mid-level exception was $5.585 million for the season and the minimum team salary, which was set at 75% of the salary cap, was $44.010 million.

For the 2007–08 season, the salary cap was set at $55.630 million ($3.05 million), the tax level was $67.865 million ($3.285 million) and the mid-level exception was $5.356 million ($229,000).

References

External links

 
NBA
2008–09 in Canadian basketball